Ana is a Pakistani TV drama that aired on PTV in early 1984. It was written by Fatima Surayya Bajia and directed by Haider Imam Rizvi.

Synopsis
It is a story of three generations and about a girl who brings together her estranged parents.

Cast
 Shakeel          
 Ghazala Kaifee
 Begum Khursheed Mirza   
 Izhar Qazi
 Mehreen Ilahi
 Azra Sherwani
 Ishrat Hashmi
 Arsh Muneer
 Zeenat Yasmin
 Sajida Syed
 Yasmeen Ismail
 Sultana Zafar
 Mehmood Ali
 Khursheed Shahid
 Mehmood Akhtar
 Rizwan Wasti
 Mohammad Yousaf
 Subhani Bayounus
 Latif Kapadia
 Imtiaz Ahmed
 Hadi ul Islam
 Sultan Khan
 Ibrahim Nafees
 Humayun Khan

Production

Casting
When Fatima Surayya Bajia was looking for a new face for television at that time Izhar Qazi's striking resemblance with Indian film actor Amitabh Bachchan immediately caught her attention and she cast him in the lead role also it was his debut serial.

Accolades

References

Pakistani drama television series
Urdu-language television shows
Pakistan Television Corporation original programming
Television shows set in Karachi
Nigar Award winners
1980s Pakistani television series